Pålsjö Castle is a manor from the 17th century at  Helsingborg Municipality in Scania, Sweden.

History
The first owner of record was Danish noble Steen Basse Bille  (ca 1446–1520). Following the Treaty of Roskilde in 1658, Scania became a possession of the Swedish Crown. The current building was built in the period 1676-79 following  the Scanian War (1676–1679) during which the estate was largely destroyed while  the Danish army in Scania was defeated  by the Swedish army. 
During the Battle of Helsingborg in 1710, Swedish field marshal  Magnus Stenbock (1665–1717) had his headquarters at Pålsjö.

The French-style   park was founded in the 1760s. During 1869–1873, the manor was reconstructed in Neo-Renaissance style. The city of Helsingborg bought the estate Pålsjö in 1908 and acquired the manor building with the surrounding park in 1957.

See also
List of castles in Sweden

References

Buildings and structures in Helsingborg
17th-century establishments in Skåne County